Lieutenant Lansing Colton Holden, Jr. was a World War I flying ace credited with seven aerial victories.

World War I service
Holden dropped out of Princeton and went to France to join the fight. He was originally attached to French aviation's Escadrille 461 in April 1918 to defend Paris against German air attack. He then transferred to the 95th Aero Squadron in July as a Spad XIII pilot. He survived being shot down on 10 August before he scored his first victory on 29 September 1918. After destroying that German observation balloon, it would take him almost a month to score again; on 23 October, Holden teamed with Edward Peck Curtis to down a Fokker D.VII at 1630 hours, and then shot down another balloon solo. Four days later, Holden shot down a Hannover CL. He turned balloon buster again for his last three victories, on 30 October and 3 and 4 November 1918.

Postwar life
Holden returned to college at Princeton University, graduated, and took up his father's Lansing C. Holden, Sr. profession of architect. He returned to France in 1923, attended the École nationale supérieure des Beaux-Arts in Paris where he studied illustration, and married. The following year, he took up arms again, serving as a captain during the Rif War in Morocco, and winning the Légion d'honneur.

In 1932, he briefly went to Hollywood to work on movies, notably with She (1935) and The Three Musketeers (1935), with him serving as director and production illustrator on the former (it was the only feature film he would ever direct). Holden illustrated an unofficial history of the 95th Aero called Squadron 95, written by fellow squadron member Harold Robert Buckley in 1933 The book has been in publication as recently as 1972.

He then returned to New York. He became an officer in the Air National Guard's 102nd Observation Squadron. On 13 November 1938, while attempting a landing in dodgy weather, he crashed to his death near Sparta, Tennessee.

Honors and awards
Text of citation for the Distinguished Service Cross (DSC), as promulgated in General Orders No. 46, War Department, 1919:

The Distinguished Service Cross is presented to Lansing Colton Holden, Jr., First Lieutenant (Air Service), U.S. Army, for extraordinary heroism in action near Montigny, France, October 23, 1918. Lieutenant Holden was ordered to attack several German balloons, reported to be regulating effective artillery fire on our troops. After driving off an enemy plane, encountered before reaching the balloons, he soon came upon five balloons in ascension one kilometer apart. In attacking the first, which proved to be a decoy with a basket, his guns jammed; after clearing them he attacked the second balloon, forcing the observer to jump. His guns again jammed before he could set fire to this balloon. Moving on the third balloon at a height of only 50 meters, he set fire to it and compelled the observer to jump. He was prevented from attacking the two remaining balloons by the further jamming of his machine gun.
 
Text of citation for the Oak Leaf Cluster for the Distinguished Service Cross (DSC) as promulgated in General Orders No. 46, War Department, 1919:

The Distinguished Service Cross is presented to Lansing Colton Holden, Jr., First Lieutenant (Air Service), U.S. Army, for extraordinary heroism in action near St. Jean de Buzy, France, November 4, 1918. Flying at a low altitude to evade hostile pursuit patrols, Lieutenant Holden attacked a German observation balloon in the face of antiaircraft and machine-gun fire. Although the balloon was being rapidly pulled own, he set fire to it in its nest and also caused much damage to adjacent buildings.

See also

 List of World War I flying aces from the United States

References

Further reading
 Norman Franks and Frank Bailey. Over the Front: A Complete Record of the Fighter Aces and Units of the United States and French Air Services, 1914-1918. London: Grub Street, 1992.
  Norman Franks and Harry Dempsey. American Aces of World War I. Oxford: Osprey Publishing Ltd., 2001. , .
 Jon Guttman. USAS 1st Pursuit Group. Oxford: Osprey Publishing Ltd., 2008.

External links
 Lansing Holden, The Aerodrome

1896 births
1938 deaths
Recipients of the Distinguished Service Cross (United States)
American World War I flying aces
People from Brooklyn
Film directors from New York City